Meydan-e Horr Metro Station is a station in Tehran Metro Line 2. It is located in Hor Square the junction of Imam Khomeini Street and Kargar Street. It is between Imam Ali University Metro Station and Navvab Metro Station.

References

Tehran Metro stations